Mathis is a city in San Patricio County, Texas, United States. The population was 4,942 at the 2010 census.

History

In 1887, when the San Antonio and Aransas Pass Railroad was laying tracks across San Patricio County, Thomas H. Mathis received naming rights when he donated  for a townsite and school. Mathis and his brother J. M. Mathis, held  in the vicinity. The brothers had dropped out of the Coleman, Mathis, Fulton Cattle Company in 1879. Thomas Mathis owned an additional  around Mathis and built a fence enclosing the town. As late as 1906, Mathis was enclosed and arriving and departing trains had to be let in and out.

Mathis' success was partially fueled by residents of Lagarto moving to be near the railroad. The Mathis post office opened in 1890 and the town's first school was held in a private residence in 1893. Two years later, a one-room school was built, and in 1913, a second railroad (the San Antonio, Uvalde and Gulf Pacific) arrived.

Cotton and corn crops were raised and ranching was an important part of the economy. During the 1930s, winter vegetable crops were grown and both railroads maintained shipping sheds. Mathis incorporated in 1939.

In the early 1950s,  of land two miles (3 km) north of town were developed for vegetable crops—complete with irrigation and deep-water wells. Cotton, corn, and sorghum replaced vegetables in the 1960s.

In the 1930s, the Nueces River was dammed and Lake Mathis (since renamed Lake Corpus Christi) was formed. Construction of the Wesley Seale Dam in the late 1950s raised the level of the lake to where it became desirable for weekend homes.

In 1988, Mathis had a population of 5,910 which has since decreased to 5,034.
The game mode "Longshot" in Madden 18 and 19 is set primarily in Mathis.

Lake Corpus Christi (Lake Mathis)

The lake is a recreational spot in South Texas offering swimming, skiing, boating, and fishing. Large areas of submerged brush in the upper reaches of this  lake provide prime fish habitat. All fishing is good, but it is noted for its excellent catfish—channels, flatheads, and blues; the record is a flathead weighing . Also, the lake is noted for its white, black, and striped bass, sunfish, and crappie.

The area is a winter home for hundreds of winter Texans from all parts of the state and country, as well as Canada.

A main attraction is Lake Corpus Christi State Park, whose  surround a cove, protected from the prevailing southeasterly winds by high limestone cliffs, and provide a scenic view of the main body of the lake. Favorable climate offers opportunities for year-round activities.

History abounds in the area, with former battlegrounds now lush with farmland, brush, and grass for grazing cattle. The Nueces River at one time divided Texas from Mexico. It was a much-disputed boundary, and  only after the Mexican War was the issue was settled, making the Rio Grande the official boundary. The area, once inhabited by Karankawa and Lipan Apache Indians, became the site of several unsuccessful settlement attempts in the 18th and 19th centuries.

Geography

Mathis is located at  (28.094098, –97.827323).

Demographics

2020 census

As of the 2020 United States census, there were 4,333 people, 1,784 households, and 1,164 families residing in the city.

2000 census
As of the census of 2000, 5,034 people, 1,502 households, and 1,203 families resided in the city. The population density was 2,532.0 people per square mile (976.7/km). The 1,715 housing units  averaged 862.6 per square mile (332.7/km). The racial makeup of the city was 53.83% White, 1.63% African American, 0.91% Native American, 0.42% Asian, 0.10% Pacific Islander, 40.09% from other races, and 3.02% from two or more races. Hispanics or Latinos of any race were 90.50% of the population .

Of the 1,502 households, 43.7% had children under the age of 18 living with them, 52.6% were married couples living together, 21.5% had a female householder with no husband present, and 19.9% were not families. About 17.8% of all households were made up of individuals, and 9.8% had someone living alone who was 65 years of age or older. The average household size was 3.31 and the average family size was 3.77.

In the city, the population was distributed as 34.7% under the age of 18, 9.6% from 18 to 24, 25.8% from 25 to 44, 17.4% from 45 to 64, and 12.5% who were 65 years of age or older. The median age was 30 years. For every 100 females, there were 94.5 males. For every 100 females age 18 and over, there were 91.6 males.

The median income for a household in the city was $20,015, and for a family was $23,793. Males had a median income of $25,945 versus $18,458 for females. The per capita income for the city was $8,516. About 31.4% of families and 38.2% of the population were below the poverty line, including 49.3% of those under age 18 and 30.0% of those age 65 or over.

Education
The City of Mathis is served by the Mathis Independent School District. Its campuses include:
Mathis High School, Mathis High School for International Studies, Mathis Middle School, Mathis Intermediate, and Mathis Elementary School.

Climate
The climate in this area is characterized by hot, humid summers and generally mild to cool winters.  According to the Köppen climate classification system, Mathis has a humid subtropical climate, Cfa on climate maps.

References

Cities in Texas
Cities in San Patricio County, Texas
Cities in the Corpus Christi metropolitan area
Populated places established in 1890
1890 establishments in Texas